Vasilj is a village in the municipality of Knjaževac, Serbia. According to the 2011 census, the village has a population of 596 people.

References

External links
 http://popis2011.stat.rs/?page_id=2162&lang=lat

Populated places in Zaječar District